Castlelyons GAA is a Gaelic football and hurling club located in the small town of Castlelyons in east County Cork, Ireland. The club is affiliated with Cork county board and Imokilly division.

Roll of Honour

Football:
 East Cork Junior B Championship Winners (2) 1968, 2005
 Cork Junior B Football Championship Winners (2) 1989, 2014

Hurling:
 Cork Premier Intermediate Hurling Championship Runners-Up 2013, 2020, 2021
 Cork Intermediate Hurling Championship Winners (1) 1998
 Munster Intermediate Club Hurling Championship Winners (1) 1998
 Cork Junior Hurling Championship Winners (1) 1997
 Munster Junior Club Hurling Championship Winners (1) 1997
 East Cork Junior A Hurling Championship Winners (3) 1955, 1993, 1997
 Cork Junior B Hurling Championship Winners (1) 1991
 East Cork Junior B Hurling Championship Winners (4) 1953, 1965, 1972, 1986
 Cork Under-21 B Hurling Championship Winner (1) 2010
 Cork Premier Minor Hurling Championship Runners-Up 2011
 Cork Premier 2 Minor Hurling Championship Winners (1) 2010

Notable players
 Timmy McCarthy
 Eoin Fitzgerald
 Niall O'Leary
 Ciaran McGann
 Colm Spillane

References

External links
Castlelyons GAA site

Gaelic games clubs in County Cork
Hurling clubs in County Cork
Gaelic football clubs in County Cork